The Unicorn (Swedish: Enhörningen) is a 1955 Swedish drama film directed by Gustaf Molander and starring Inga Tidblad, Birger Malmsten and Edvin Adolphson. It was shot at the Råsunda Studios in Stockholm. The film's sets were designed by the art director P.A. Lundgren.

Cast
 Inga Tidblad as 	Harriet Allard
 Birger Malmsten as Christer Allard
 Edvin Adolphson as 	Claes von Klitzow
 Olof Bergström as Frank Allard
 Sture Lagerwall as 	Ossian Liewenskiöld
 Kristina Adolphson as 	Louise von Klitzow
 Isa Quensel as 	Harriet's Mother
 Hans Strååt as	Harriet's Father
 Helge Hagerman as 	Police Inspector
 Catrin Westerlund as 	Maria, Allard's housewife 
 Svea Holst as 	Kristin, Allard's housewife
 Märta Dorff as 	Anna, nurse 
 Annalisa Ericson as 	Agneta Wollter 
 Elsa Ebbesen as 	Mina, Harriet's parent's housewife
 Ivar Wahlgren as 	Speaker at Frank's party
 Olav Riégo as 	Hospital doctor
 Claes Thelander as 	Priest
 Gunvor Pontén as 	Woman at the ball 
 Gösta Prüzelius as 	Officer at the ball 
 Curt Löwgren as 	Waiter at the Operabaren

References

Bibliography 
 Qvist, Per Olov & von Bagh, Peter. Guide to the Cinema of Sweden and Finland. Greenwood Publishing Group, 2000.

External links 
 

1955 films
Swedish drama films
1955 drama films
1950s Swedish-language films
Films directed by Gustaf Molander
Swedish black-and-white films
1950s Swedish films